Government Polytechnic Tadepalligudem (GPT Tadepalligudem) is a polytechnic college offering diploma courses of Civil Engineering and Mechanical Engineering located in Tadepalligudem of West Godavari District of Andhra Pradesh, India. The college is governed by the rules and guidelines provided by the AICTE  and established in 2008. The principal is the administrative and the academic head of the college.

Campus and location 
GPT TPG began functioning from 2008 in a temporary campus at D.R. Goenka Degree college Pentapadu and  STVN High school, Pentapadu, Tadepalligudem. The college's permanent campus is located at Aerodrome, Tadepalligudem.

Departments 
GPT TPG is under the State Board of Technical Education & Training, Andhra Pradesh and All India Council for Technical Education approved. This institute offers two diploma courses.
 Department of Civil Engineering
 Department of Mechanical Engineering

Academics 
Admission to diploma course is through the POLYCET and conducted every year by SBTET.

References 

Colleges in Andhra Pradesh
Universities and colleges in West Godavari district
Educational institutions established in 2008
2008 establishments in Andhra Pradesh